Tamulpur district, was an administrative district in Bodoland Territorial Region of Assam, one of the North-Eastern states of India. The administrative headquartered at Tamulpur. 

In 2021, the Cabinet of Assam, headed by Chief Minister Himanta Biswa Sarma, approved the proposal to make Tamulpur a full-fledged district. On 23 January 2022 Tamulpur was formally created. Last ADC I/C Tamulpur was Dr. Bedanga Talukdar, ACS. 

On 30 December 2022, Assam Government has decided to remerge the with Baksa district and From, 1 January 2023 district ceased to exist. The decision came before delimitation process in the state.

Demographics
At the time of the 2011 census, Tamulpur district had a population of 389,150. Scheduled Castes and Scheduled Tribes made up 42,246 (10.86%) and 121,321 (31.17%) of the population respectively.

Religion

Hinduism is followed by 324,396 (83.36%) and is the majority religion. Muslims are 50,486 (12.97%) while Christians are 12,533 (3.22%).

Language

At the time of the 2011 census, 36.96% of the population spoke Assamese, 25.40% Boro, 22.33% Bengali, 5.18% Nepali and 4.67% Santali as their first language.

References

Districts of Assam
Tamulpur district